Nikolai Petrovich Krestobintsev (born 22 June 1970) is a former Russian football player.

Krestobintsev played in the Russian Top League with FC Asmaral Moscow.

References

1970 births
Living people
Soviet footballers
FC Energiya Volzhsky players
Russian footballers
FC Asmaral Moscow players
Russian Premier League players
Association football defenders
FC Iskra Smolensk players